Pingvin RC is a Swedish rugby club in Trelleborg. They currently play in Allsvenskan.

History
The club was founded in 1962.

External links
Pingvin RC

Swedish rugby union teams
Rugby clubs established in 1962
1962 establishments in Sweden